KJTV (950 AM, "100.7 The Score") is a Lubbock, Texas, radio station broadcasting with a daytime power of 5,000 watts. Programming includes both local and nationally syndicated sports talk shows.  It is owned by Ramar Communications Inc., co-owned with several sister radio stations.  Its studios are located at 98th and University in south Lubbock, and its transmitter is in Mackenzie Park east of downtown.

History
KJTV (as KSEL 950 1,000 watts day, 500 watts night) was the second radio station established in Lubbock, signing on in 1947. KCBD 1590 was third in 1949 and KFYO was the first, established in Lubbock in 1932.

In 2010, Ramar Communications purchased FM translator K264AN (100.7 FM) and began simulcasting Fox Talk 950, as permitted under new FCC rules passed in 2009.

On July 1, 2013 KJTV was re-branded as "AM 950/100.7 FM Lubbock's News, Talk, Sports".  News/Talk and Ag programming air seven days a week from Midnight-3p, with NBC Sports Radio and sports play-by-play airing from 3p-Midnight, seven days a week.

On August 7, 2017 KJTV flipped formats from news/talk/sports to all-sports, debuting the branding of "100.7 The Score". Programming includes local shows from Double T 97.3 hosts and national shows from a variety of networks including ESPN Radio, NBC Sports Radio and Sports Byline USA.

FM Translator
KJTV (AM) uses the FM translator frequency as the main frequency in the logo; the translator is used to widen the broadcast area and to give listeners the ability to listen to the station on FM with better quality sound.

External links
Ramar Communications Website

JTV (AM)
News and talk radio stations in the United States
Radio stations established in 1947
1947 establishments in Texas